Oceania Television Network (OTV) is Palau's only Pacific Island-content television station.  Founded by Jeff Barabe and Kassi Berg of Roll 'em Productions, and launched in December 2006, OTV now broadcasts on Palau National Communications Corporation digital cable channel 23.  It is a member of the Asia-Pacific Institute for Broadcasting Development.

Content for this station includes several original programs, including "The Jock Block" hosted by Mike Fox and Myers Techitong, and "Chised" hosted by Joe Aitaro and Pia Morei.  Other shows include "Uum era a Belau", the local cooking show; "Olekaiang", a comedy for youth; local news and weather.

In August 2007, Executive Producer Kassi Berg travelled to Fiji and New Zealand as part of the North-meets-South mission to meet with Pacific Island producers, in order to build partnerships and obtain content for OTV.

External links
 Official website

Television stations in Palau
Television channels and stations established in 2006